The men's cross country mountain biking competition at the 2018 Commonwealth Games in Gold Coast, Australia was held on 12 April in the Nerang National Park.

Schedule
The schedule was as follows:

All times are Australian Eastern Standard Time (UTC+10)

Results
The results were as follows:

References

Cycling at the 2018 Commonwealth Games
Mountain biking at the Commonwealth Games
2018 in mountain biking